Digby Cayley Wrangham (1805–1863) was an English barrister and politician.

Life
He was the second son of Francis Wrangham. He graduated B.A. with a double first-class from Brasenose College, Oxford, in 1826. After leaving Oxford, he was for some years private secretary to Lord Aberdeen in the Foreign Office.

Called to the bar from Gray's Inn in 1831, Wrangham was the same year elected Member of Parliament for Sudbury. He served until 1832, then was created Queen's serjeant in 1847, and became father of the parliamentary bar.

Family
Wrangham married Amelia, daughter of Walter Fawkes. They had two sons and two daughters. Of the sons, Digby Strangeways Wrangham was a clergyman and writer.

Notes

Attribution

1805 births
1863 deaths
Alumni of Brasenose College, Oxford
English barristers
Principal Private Secretaries to the Secretary of State for Foreign and Commonwealth Affairs
Members of the Parliament of the United Kingdom for English constituencies
People from Hunmanby
Presidents of the Oxford Union
UK MPs 1831–1832
19th-century English lawyers